Mountain Elementary School District is a public school district based in Santa Cruz County, California, United States.

External links
 

School districts in Santa Cruz County, California